Revolution of 1880 also known as The Revolution of Carlos Tejedor, was a military conflict between the government of the Province of Buenos Aires, and the National government chaired by Nicolás Avellaneda. The event took place in June 1880, ending June 23 after the Battle of the Corrales Viejos.

References 

Battles involving Argentina
Battles of the Argentine Civil War